Pyu may refer to:

Pyu, town in Taungoo District, Bago Region in Burma (Myanmar), named after the ancient Pyu kingdom of Burma
Pyu city-states, collection of city-states of the central and northern regions of modern-day Burma (Myanmar), founded by the people of the same name
Pyu language (Sino-Tibetan), ancient Tibeto-Burman language of Southeast Asia spoken in the area of present-day Burma and Thailand
Pyu language (Papuan), language isolate spoken in Papua New Guinea
Pyu Township, township in Taungoo District in the Bago Region of Burma (Myanmar)

See also
Pyu to Fuku! Jaguar